A School of Journalism and (Mass) Communication  may refer any number of higher level academic institutions which combine the fields of journalism and communication or mass communication. The title may refer to:

United States
 A.Q. Miller School of Journalism and Mass Communications
 Gaylord College of Journalism and Mass Communication
 Henry W. Grady College of Journalism and Mass Communication
 University of Minnesota School of Journalism and Mass Communication
 University of North Carolina at Chapel Hill School of Journalism and Mass Communication
 University of Oregon School of Journalism and Communication
 University of Wisconsin–Madison School of Journalism & Mass Communication
 Walter Cronkite School of Journalism and Mass Communication

Philippines
 Asian Institute of Journalism and Communication, Philippines